is a railway station on the Tadami Line in the town of Mishima, Ōnuma District, Fukushima Prefecture, Japan, operated by East Japan Railway Company (JR East).

Lines

Station layout
Hayato Station has one side platform serving ta single bi-directional track. There is no station building, but only a concrete shelter on then platform. The station is unattended.

History
The station was absorbed into the JR East network upon the privatization of the JNR on April 1, 1987.

Surrounding area
Hayato Station is located in an isolated rural location with no buildings nearby.

Tadami River
Hayato Onsen

In media
The 5th episode of the TV series "Tetsu Ota Michiko, 20,000 km" is dedicated to this station

See also
 List of railway stations in Japan

References

External links

 JR East Station information 

Railway stations in Fukushima Prefecture
Tadami Line
Railway stations in Japan opened in 1956
Stations of East Japan Railway Company
Mishima, Fukushima